In U.S., Canadian, and Mexican broadcasting, a city of license or community of license is the community that a radio station or television station is officially licensed to serve by that country's broadcast regulator.

In North American broadcast law, the concept of community of license dates to the early days of AM radio broadcasting. The requirement that a broadcasting station operate a main studio within a prescribed distance of the community which the station is licensed to serve appears in U.S. law as early as 1939.

Various specific obligations have been applied to broadcasters by governments to fulfill public policy objectives of broadcast localism, both in radio and later also in television, based on the legislative presumption that a broadcaster fills a similar role to that held by community newspaper publishers.

United States 
In the United States, the Communications Act of 1934 requires that "the Commission shall make such distribution of licenses, frequencies, hours of operation, and of ower among the several States and communities as to provide a fair, efficient, and equitable distribution of radio service to each of the same."  The Federal Communications Commission interprets this as requiring that every broadcast station "be licensed to the principal community or other political subdivision which it primarily serves."  For each broadcast service, the FCC defines a standard for what it means to serve a community; for example, commercial FM radio stations are required to provide a field strength of at least 3.16 millivolts per meter (mV/m) over the entire land area of the community, whereas non-commercial educational FM stations need only provide a field strength of 1 mV/m over 50% of the community's population.  This electric field contour is called the "principal community contour".

The Federal Communications Commission (FCC) makes other requirements on stations relative to their communities of license; these requirements have varied over time.  One example is the requirement for stations to identify themselves, by call sign and community, at sign-on, sign-off, and at the top of every hour of operation.  Other current requirements include providing a local telephone number in the community's calling area (or else a toll-free number). The former requirement to (in most cases) maintain an official main studio within 25 miles of the community's geographic center was discontinued in December 2017 when the regulation was amended.

Policy and regulatory issues

Nominal main studio requirements
The requirement that a station maintain a main studio within a station's primary coverage area or within a maximum distance of the community of license originated in an era in which stations were legally required to generate local content and the majority of a station's local, non-network programming was expected to originate in one central studio location. In this context, the view of broadcast regulators held that an expedient way to ensure that content broadcast reflected the needs of a local community was to allocate local broadcast stations and studios to each individual city.

The nominal main studio requirement has become less relevant with the introduction of videotape recorders in 1956 (which allowed local content to be easily generated off-site and transported to stations), the growing portability of broadcast-quality production equipment due to transistorization and the elimination of requirements (in 1987 for most classes of US broadcast stations) that broadcasters originate any minimum amount of local content.

While the main studio concept nominally remains in US broadcast regulations, and certain administrative requirements (such as the local employment of a manager and the equivalent of at least one other full-time staff member, as well as the maintenance of a public inspection file) are still applied, removal of the requirement that stations originate local content greatly weakens the significance of maintaining a local main studio. A facility capable of originating programming and feeding it to a transmitter must still exist, but under normal conditions there most often is no requirement that these local studio actually be in active use to originate any specific local programming.

In many cases, the use of centralcasting and broadcast automation has greatly weakened the role and importance of manual control by staff at the nominal local station studio facilities.

Exceptions to these rules have been made by regulators, primarily on a case-by-case basis, to deal with "satellite stations": transmitters which are licensed to comply with the technical requirements of full service broadcast facilities and have their own independent call signs and communities of license but are used simply as full-power broadcast translators to rebroadcast another station. These are most often non-commercial educational stations or stations serving thinly populated areas which otherwise would be too small to support an independent local full-service broadcaster.

Political considerations
The requirement that a full-service station maintain local presence in its community of license has been used by proponents of localism and community broadcasting as a means to oppose the construction and use of local stations as mere rebroadcasters or satellite-fed translators of distant stations. Without specific requirements for service to the local community of license, stations could be constructed in large number by out-of-region broadcasters who feed transmitters via satellite and offer no local content.

There also has been a de facto preference by regulators to encourage the assignment of broadcast licenses to smaller cities which otherwise would have no local voice, instead of allowing all broadcast activity to be concentrated in large metropolitan areas already served by many existing broadcasters.

When dealing with multiple competing US radio station applications, current FM allotment priorities are: (1) first full-time aural service; (2) second full-time aural service; (3) first local aural transmission service; and (4) Other public interest matters.

Similar criteria were extended to competing applicants for non-commercial stations by US legislation passed in 2000.

Suburban community problem
Any policy favoring applicants for communities not already served by an existing station has had the unintended effect of encouraging applicants to merely list a small suburb of a large city, claiming to be the "first station in the community" even though the larger city is well served by many existing stations. "The Suburban Community Problem" was recognized in FCC policy as early as 1965. "Stations in metropolitan areas often tend to seek out national and regional advertisers and to identify themselves with the entire metropolitan area rather than with the particular needs of their specified communities," according to an FCC policy statement of the era. In order "to discourage applicants for smaller communities who would be merely substandard stations for neighboring, larger communities," the FCC established the so-called "Suburban Community presumption" which required applicants for AM stations in such markets to demonstrate that they had ascertained the unmet programming needs of the specific communities and were prepared to satisfy those needs.

By 1969, the same issues had spread to FM licensing; instead of building transmitters in the community to nominally be served, applicants would often seek to locate the tower site at least halfway to the next major city. In one such precedent case (the Berwick Doctrine), the FCC required a hearing before Berwick, a prospective broadcaster, could locate transmitters midway between Pittston, Pennsylvania (the city of license), and a larger audience in Wilkes-Barre.

A related problem was that of 'move-in'. Outlying communities would find their small-town local stations sold to outsiders, who would then attempt to change the community of license to a suburb of the nearest major city, move transmitter locations or remove existing local content from broadcasts in an attempt to move into the larger city.

The small town of Anniston, Alabama, due to its location 90 miles west of Atlanta and 65 miles east of Birmingham, has lost local content from both TV and FM stations which were re-targeted at one of the two larger urban centers or moved outright. (WHMA-FM Anniston is now licensed as WNNX College Park, Georgia—an Atlanta suburb—after a failed attempt to relicense it to Sandy Springs, Georgia—another Atlanta suburb. Transmitters are now in downtown Atlanta.) 
The same is true for WJSU, which served East Alabama with local news until the station was merged into a triplex to form ABC 33/40 which focuses its coverage on the central part of the state.

A 1988 precedent case (Faye and Richard Tuck, 3 FCC Rcd 5374, 1988) created the "Tuck Analysis" as a standard which attempts to address the Suburban Community Problem on a case-by-case basis by examining:
 the station's proposed signal coverage over the urbanized area (the "Coverage Factor");
 the relative population size and distance between the suburban community and the urban market (the "Relative Size and Distance Factor"); and
 the independence of the suburban community, based on various factors that would indicate self-sufficiency (the "Independence Factor").

Despite the best intentions of regulators, the system remains prone to manipulation.

Licensing and on-air identity
While becoming less meaningful over the decades, stations are still required to post a public file somewhere within 25 miles of the city, and to cover the entire city with a local signal.  In the United States, a station's transmitter must be located so that it can provide a strong signal over nearly all of its "principal community" (5 mV/m or stronger at night for AM stations, 70 dbuV for FM, 35 dbu for DTV channels 2–6, 43 dbu for channels 7-13 and 48 dbu for channels 14+), even if it primarily serves another city.  For example, American television station WTTV primarily serves Indianapolis; however, the transmitter is located farther south than the other stations in that city because it is licensed to Bloomington, 50 miles south of Indianapolis (it maintains a satellite station, WTTK, licensed to Kokomo, Indiana, but in the digital age, WTTK is for all intents and purposes the station's main signal, transmitting from the traditional Indianapolis transmitter site). In some cases, such as Jeannette, Pennsylvania-licensed WPCW 19, the FCC has waived this requirement; the station claimed that retaining an existing transmitter site 25.6 miles southeast of its new community of license of Jeannette would be in compliance with the commission's minimum distance separation requirements (avoiding interference to co-channel WOIO 19 Shaker Heights).  Another extreme example of a station's transmitter located far from the city of license is the FM station KPNT, formerly licensed to Ste. Genevieve, Missouri, and transmitting from Hillsboro, but serving the St. Louis and Metro East market to the north. In 2015, the station was allowed by the FCC to move their city of license to Collinsville, Illinois, and have a transmitter in St. Louis proper with a power decrease.

FCC regulations also require stations at least once an hour to state the station's call letters, followed by the city of license.  However, the FCC has no restrictions on additional names after the city of license, so many stations afterwards add the nearest large city.  For example, CBS affiliate WOIO is licensed to Shaker Heights, a suburb of Cleveland, and thus identifies as "WOIO Shaker Heights-Cleveland." Similarly, northern New York's WWNY-TV (also a CBS affiliate) identifies as "WWNY-TV 7 Carthage-Watertown" as a historical artifact; the original broadcasts originated from Champion Hill in 1954 so the license still reflects this tiny location.

If the station is licensed in the primary city served, on occasion the station will list a second city next to it.  For example, the Tampa Bay region's Fox owned-and-operated station WTVT is licensed to Tampa, Florida, its primary city, but identifies on-air as "WTVT Tampa/St. Petersburg", as St. Petersburg is another major city in the market.

There is no longer a requirement to carry programs relevant to the particular community,  or even necessarily to operate or transmit from that community. Accordingly, stations licensed to smaller communities in major metropolitan markets often target programming toward the entire market rather than the official home community, and often move their studio facilities to the larger urban centre as well. For instance, the Canadian radio station CFNY-FM is officially licensed to Brampton, Ontario, although its studio and transmitter facilities are located in downtown Toronto.

This may, at times, lead to confusion — while media directories normally list broadcast stations by their legal community of license, audiences often disregard (or may even be entirely unaware of) the distinction. For instance, for a short time while resolving a license conflict and ownership transaction in 1989, the current day KCAL-TV in Los Angeles was licensed to the little-known southeast suburb of Norwalk, California, with the station's identifications at the time only vocally mentioning the temporary city of license in a rushed form, with Norwalk barely receiving any visual mention on the station; at no time were any station assets actually based in Norwalk, nor was public affairs or news programming adjusted to become Norwalk-centric over that of Los Angeles and Southern California. The station returned to its Los Angeles city of license after the transaction was complete.

Often, a station will keep a tiny outlying community in its licensing and on-air identity long after the original rationale for choosing that location is no longer truly applicable. Sneedville, Tennessee, as city of license for PBS member station WETP-TV originally made sense as a compromise location to serve both Knoxville and the Tri-Cities of Tennessee and Virginia on VHF channel 2. It met the minimum distance requirements to two other channel 2 stations in the region, WKRN in Nashville and WSB-TV in Atlanta. This became less important after full-power UHF satellite WKOP-TV signed on in Knoxville, and irrelevant once the 2003-09 DTV transition and 2016-21 repack moved WETP's main signal to physical channel UHF 24.  Nonetheless, broadcasters and regulatory authorities are more likely to retain the original city of license, rather than bring unwanted scrutiny for taking away a small community's only station, which may be a mark of civic pride, only to move it to some larger center which already has multiple stations.

Table of allotments 
In the United States, the Federal Communications Commission maintains a Table of Allotments, which assigns individual channel frequencies to individual cities or communities for both TV and FM radio.

A corresponding Table of Allotments for digital television was created in 1997. To operate a licensed station, a broadcaster must first obtain allocation of the desired frequencies in the FCC's Table of Allotments for the intended city of license. This process is subject to various political and bureaucratic restrictions, based on considerations including the number of existing stations in the area.

The term "city" has in some cases been relaxed to mean "community", often including the unincorporated areas around the city that share a mailing address. This sometimes leads to inconsistencies, such as the licensing of one metro Atlanta station to the unincorporated Cobb County community of Mableton, but the refusal to license another to Sandy Springs, which is one of the largest cities in the state, and was at the time an unincorporated part of Fulton County only for political reasons in the Georgia General Assembly.

The definition of a "community" also comes into play when a broadcaster wants to take a station away from a tiny hamlet like North Pole, New York, whose population is in decline. In general, regulators are loath to allow a community's only license to be moved away - especially to a city which already has a station. A broadcaster may make the case that the "community" functionally no longer exists in order to be released from its local obligations. 

Often, the city of license does not correspond to the location of the station itself, of the primary audience or of the communities identified in the station's branding and advertising.

Some of the more common reasons for a community of license to be listed as a point far from the actual audience include:

The "compromise" location
A broadcaster may wish to serve two different communities, both in the same region but far enough from each other that a transmitter in one market would provide poor service to the other. While a transmitter in each community served would be preferable, occasionally a station licensed to a small town between the two larger centres will be used.

The suburban station
In FM radio broadcasting, small local stations were sometimes built to serve suburban or outlying areas in an era where AM radio stations held the largest audiences and much of the FM spectrum lay vacant. In the era of vacuum tubes, the five-tube AM radio with no FM tuning capability and limited audio quality was common; later advances in receiver design were to make good-quality FM commonplace (even though most AM/FM stereo receivers still have severely limited AM frequency response and no AM stereo decoders). Eventually FM spectrum became a very scarce commodity in many markets as AM stations moved to the FM dial, relegating AM largely to talk radio. As cities expanded, former small-town FM stations found themselves not only in what were now becoming rapidly expanding suburbs but also on what was becoming some of the most valuable spectrum in broadcast radio. The once-tiny FM stations would often then be sold, increased (where possible) to much-higher power and used to serve a huge mainstream audience in the larger metropolitan area.

The short-spaced station
To avoid co-channel interference, a minimum distance is maintained between stations operating on the same frequency in different markets. On VHF, full-power stations are typically 175 miles or more apart before the same channel is used again. An otherwise-desirable channel may therefore be unavailable to a community unless either it is operated at greatly reduced-height and power, forced onto a strongly directional antenna pattern to protect the distant co-channel station or relocated to some other, more distant location in the region to maintain proper spacing. The choice of another community as home for a station can be one possible means to avoid short-spacing, effectively shifting the entire station's coverage area to maintain the required distances between transmitters.

The distant mountaintop antenna
In hilly or mountainous regions, a city would often be built in a waterfront or lakeside location (such as Plattsburgh-Burlington, both on Lake Champlain) - lower ground which in turn would be surrounded by tall mountain peaks. The only reliable means to get the VHF television or radio signals over the mountains was to build a station atop one of the mountain peaks. This occasionally left stations with a distant mountaintop (or its nearest small crossroads) as the historical city of license, even though the audience was elsewhere.

The relocation of an existing station
Often, a license for a new station will not be available in a community, either because a regulatory agency was only willing to accept new applications within specified narrow timeframes or because there are no suitable vacant channels. A prospective broadcaster must therefore buy an existing station as the only way to readily enter the market, in some cases being left with a station in a suburban, outlying or adjacent-market area if that were the only facility available for sale.

The border blaster
Occasionally, a community on an international border is served using a station licensed to another country. This may provide access to less restrictive broadcast regulation or represent a means to use local marketing agreements or adjacent-market licenses to circumvent limits on the number of stations under common ownership.

The last-available frequency allocation
In the early days of television, the majority of stations could be found on the VHF band; in North America, this currently represents just twelve possible channels and in large markets any suitable allocations in this range were mostly full by the early 1950s. Occasionally, a prospective broadcaster could obtain one of these coveted positions by acquiring an existing station or permit in an adjacent community - although in some cases this meant a move out-of-state.

The new entrant
A new network or station group will often enter a market after all of the most valuable available frequencies (such as the analogue VHF TV assignments in major cities) are already taken. This often results in building a network by constructing outlying stations, UHF stations, underpowered stations or some mix of all three. That can leave transmitters licensed to some very strange or tiny places. This happened to some degree with networks which signed on in the 1960s, such as National Educational Television in the US or the CTV Television Network in Canada. Later entrants fared worse.

In the U.S., PAX Network (now Ion Television) was prone to this, building a network largely from outlying owned-and-operated UHF stations.

In Canada, third networks such as Global were often a motley collection of outlying stations in their early years. CKGN-TV, Ontario's original "Global Television Network" repeater chain, signed on in 1974 in an already densely-packed stretch of the beaten-path Windsor-Quebec corridor in which few desirable channels were available. Cities such as Windsor, London, Toronto, Peterborough, Kingston and Cornwall are notable by their absence from the network's original roster. The five transmitters on-air in 1984 (after a decade of operation as a struggling "third network") were:
 Sarnia transmitting from Oil Springs on UHF 29 (370kW)
 Paris on VHF 6 (at the full 100kW, the most allocated to a station of this class in Ontario)
 Uxbridge on UHF 22 (at the full 5000kW, the most powerful in the nation, but on an undesirable suburban UHF allocation nowhere near downtown Toronto)
 Bancroft on VHF 2 (at 87kW - and later increased to the full 100kW, but in the speck-on-a-map unincorporated hamlet of Vennachar, near Denbigh).
 Ottawa on VHF 6 (at one-eighth the typical power for a station in its class, and on a sharp directional pattern focussed on Ottawa). This station had to protect CBMT (VHF 6, CBC Montréal) less than 120 miles distant - and this at a time when full-power VHF TV co-channel stations were typically spaced 175-200 miles (280-320km) apart to prevent interference.
The majority of these transmitters were not licensed to the primary community served. Many were underpowered, short-spaced or in undesirable locations - often just putting enough signal into key communities to obtain cable must-carry protection. As the only transmitters to be operating on then-valuable VHF channels at anything other than greatly-reduced power were licensed to Paris and Bancroft, both awkward outlying communities, the Paris transmitter was arbitrarily listed as the main station for the entire network.

The cable or digital TV placeholder
Sometimes, putting a usable over-the-air signal into the primary community served is anywhere from second-priority to not a priority at all. A station could be barely within the market's boundaries or be underpowered to the point of putting a "B" grade signal into the community at best. On anything less than a huge rooftop antenna, the station is unwatchable — but, even if the underlying over-the-air signal wasn't valuable, the corresponding cable television slots in the various communities it was almost serving were. Any full-service domestic signal above some arbitrary minimum had access to "must carry" protection, could request favourable placement on the dial and (in Canada) could engage in signal substitution to take ad revenue from other stations already carrying the same content.

The 2016-2020 OTA TV repack opened additional possibilities for using an outlying community's licence as an over-the-air placeholder. Buy a station, return the licensed broadcast spectrum to the government, then claim to be "sharing" a channel with another broadcaster by using the orphan licence to place content on one of their digital subchannels. Suddenly, an outlying commercial low-power station in New Hampshire is "sharing" space on WGBX, a full-power non-commercial station in the heart of the Boston market. The same transmitter can, by using two different licences in a "channel sharing" arrangement, have two different communities of licence - which may allow more flexibility for its location. It's also possible to mix commercial and non-commercial licences. In Canada, where CRTC regulations prevent carrying any additional, unique programming on digital subchannels without obtaining a second licence (and taking all the obligations which go with it) for each subchannel, returning just the spectrum (and keeping the licence) can be used as a means to recycle licences from abandoned, defunct outlying stations for use elsewhere in the network.

The use of an adjacent market
Occasionally, a station owner would reach a legal limit on concentration of media ownership, already having the maximum number of commonly owned stations in a market. Additional stations would be possible by transmitting the extra signals from a station technically in an adjacent market.

The arbitrary nominal location
In some cases, stations were constructed or acquired with the express purpose of driving a regional or province-wide chain of full-power repeaters. Which of these "satellite stations" would be designated as the main signal could be an arbitrary choice, as the programming carried on all stations in the system would be identical.

See also
 All Channels Act
 Border Blaster
 Rimshot (broadcasting)
 Twinstick and Duopoly (broadcasting)
 Flag of convenience (business)

Notes

References 

Broadcast law
United States communications regulation
Mass media regulation in Canada